Norwegian orthography is the method of writing the Norwegian language, of which there are two written standards: Bokmål and Nynorsk. While Bokmål has for the most part derived its forms from the written Danish language and Danish-Norwegian speech, Nynorsk gets its word forms from Aasen's reconstructed "base dialect", which is intended to represent the distinctive dialectal forms. Both standards use a 29-letter variant of the Latin alphabet and the same orthographic principles.

Alphabet
The Norwegian alphabet is based upon the Latin alphabet and is identical to the Danish alphabet. Since 1917 it has consisted of the following 29 letters.

The letters c, q, w, x and z are not used in the spelling of indigenous Norwegian words. They are rarely used; loanwords routinely have their orthography adapted to the native sound system.

Diacritics
Norwegian (especially the Nynorsk variant) also uses several letters with diacritic signs: é, è, ê, ó, ò, ô, and ù. The diacritic signs are not compulsory, but can be added to clarify the meaning of words (homonyms) which otherwise would be identical. One example is ein gut ("a boy") versus éin gut ("one boy"), in Nynorsk, as opposed to en gutt in Bokmål. Loanwords may be spelled with other diacritics, most notably ü, è, à and é, following the conventions of the original language. The Norwegian vowels æ, ø and å never take diacritics.

The diacritic signs in use include the acute accent, grave accent and the circumflex. A common example of how the diacritics change the meaning of a word, is for:
 for (preposition. For or to, Bokmål and Nynorsk)
 fór (verb. Went, in the sense went quickly, Bokmål and Nynorsk. Only to be used with the pronoun, vi)
 fòr (noun. Furrow, only Nynorsk)
 fôr (noun. Fodder, feed, fodder, Bokmål and Nynorsk)

Ò can be used in òg, meaning "also". This word is found in both Nynorsk and Bokmål. An example of ê in Nynorsk is the word vêr, meaning "weather".

Sound to spelling correspondences

Vowels

 Vowel length can usually be deduced from the spelling based on the rule that short vowels are followed by two or more consonant letters, while long vowels are followed by at most one consonant letter. There are, however, certain exceptions to this rule where vowel length must be memorised.
 In those cases where the same letter can represent two different vowel qualities, the first given vowel is by far predominant (for example, short o is usually , long o is usually ). Words where the other vowel quality occurs should, again, be memorised as exceptions.

Consonants

 Silent consonant letters are relatively frequent in Norwegian. Regular cases have already been indicated in the table above. Otherwise the letter d is frequently silent, especially in the clusters ld, nd, rd, but also sometimes after a long vowel. T is silent in det ("the, that, it") and in the definite-article suffix -et. G is silent in the suffixes -ig, -lig and in some other words like og ("and"), morgen ("morning"). V is silent in selv ("self") and halv ("half").

History
The letter Å (HTML &aring;) was officially introduced in Norwegian in 1917, replacing Aa or aa. The new letter came from the Swedish alphabet, where it had been in official use since the 18th century. The former digraph Aa still occurs in personal names. Geographical names tend to follow the current orthography, meaning that the letter å will be used. Family names may not follow modern orthography, and as such retain the digraph aa where å would be used today. Aa remains in use as a transliteration, if the letter is not available for technical reasons. Aa is treated like Å in alphabetical sorting, not like two adjacent letters A, meaning that while a is the first letter of the alphabet, aa is the last. This rule does not apply to non-Scandinavian names, so a modern atlas would list the German city of Aachen under A but list the Danish city of Aabenraa under Å.

A difference between the Dano-Norwegian and the Swedish alphabet is that Swedish uses the variant Ä instead of Æ, and the variant Ö instead of Ø (like German). Also, the collating order for these three letters is different: Å, Ä, Ö.

Computing standards

In computing, several different coding standards have existed for this alphabet:
IBM PC code page 865
ISO 8859-1
NS 4551-1, later established in international standard ISO 646
Unicode

See also
Norwegian phonology
Norwegian language conflict
Danish phonology
Futhark, the Germanic runes used formerly
Icelandic orthography
Latin spelling alphabets
Swedish alphabet

References

External links
Type Norwegian characters online

Orthography
Indo-European Latin-script orthographies